Shaul Mukamel (born 1948) is a chemist, currently serving as a professor at the University of California, Irvine.

Early life and education
Shaul Mukamel was born in Baghdad, Iraq on December 11, 1948. Mukamel received his B.Sc. degree in 1969, with the distinction cum laude and his M.Sc. and Ph.D., both summa cum laude, in 1971 and 1976 respectively from Tel Aviv University. His Masters supervisor was Uzi Kaldor. He finished his PhD working under Joshua Jortner. Following graduation, Mukamel served as postdoc at MIT and the University of California, Berkeley.

Career
Mukamel has worked at Rice University and the Weizmann Institute before joining University of Rochester, where he worked from 1982 to 2003. He has been at University of California, Irvine since then.

Mukamel is known for his work in the field of nonlinear optics, especially the time domain extensions which culminated in the widely appreciated book entitled Principles of Nonlinear Optical Spectroscopy (1995). His present and past works encompass wide range of topics ranging from excitons to multi-dimensional spectroscopy, and femto– and attosecond spectroscopy. During his career, he has published more than 1000 scientific papers.

Mukamel has received numerous prizes and distinctions including the Alexander von Humboldt Research Award, the Hamburg Prize for Theoretical Physics, and the Ahmed Zewail ACS Award in Ultrafast Science and Technology.

Awards and honors
1987 – Fellow of the American Physical Society
1996 – Guggenheim Fellowship
2003 – Ellis R. Lippincott Award
2011 – Earle K. Plyler Prize for Molecular Spectroscopy
2012 – Hamburg Prize for Theoretical Physics
2013 – Willis E. Lamb Award
2013 – Member of the American Academy of Arts and Sciences
2015 – Member of the National Academy of Sciences
2017 – William F. Meggers Award in Spectroscopy

References

1948 births
Living people
Israeli chemists
Rice University faculty
University of California, Berkeley faculty
University of California, Irvine faculty
Tel Aviv University alumni
University of Rochester faculty
Fellows of the American Academy of Arts and Sciences
Fellows of the American Physical Society
Fellows of Optica (society)
Humboldt Research Award recipients
Members of the United States National Academy of Sciences